Carlo Labruzzo (1748–1817) was an Italian painter, primarily of landscapes who was born in Rome.

In 1798, he was nominated professor at the Academy of Fine Arts of Perugia, and in 1812, he became director. He died in Perugia in December 1817. He was replaced by Tommaso Minardi. Among his pupils in Perugia were Silvestro Massari, Margherita Lazi, and Marianna Candidi Dionigi.

References

1817 deaths
18th-century Italian painters
Italian male painters
19th-century Italian painters
Umbrian painters
19th-century Italian male artists
1748 births
18th-century Italian male artists